Zaj Kan or Zachgan or Zajkan or Zachkan or Zadzhkan may refer to:

Zaj Kan-e Sofla, Qazvin Province
Zachkan, Zanjan Province